Aten, properly called The Dazzling Aten though dubbed initially by archaeologists the Rise of Aten, is the remains of an ancient Egyptian city on the west bank of the Nile in the Theban Necropolis near Luxor. Named after Egyptian sun god Aten, the city appears to have remained relatively intact for over three millennia. Since excavation began in late 2020, it is emerging as the largest city of its kind in ancient Egypt, with a remarkable degree of preservation, leading to comparisons with Pompeii.

History

The city's foundation is dated to the period of Amenhotep III, some 3,400 years ago (1386–1353 BCE). A number of inscriptions enabled archaeologists to establish precise dates for the city's history. One refers to 1337 BCE, coinciding with the reign of Akhenaten, who is thought to have shifted to his new capital at Akhetaten the following year. Traces uncovered so far suggest that Aten subsequently fell under the rule of Tutankhaten, who changed his name to Tutankhamun after another Egyptian god, and thereafter was used by the penultimate ruler of the Eighteenth Dynasty, Ay. So far four distinct settlement layers attest to renewed habitation as late as the Coptic Byzantine era, from the 3rd to 7th centuries CE.

Discovery
Many previous exploratory missions had endeavoured to locate the city only to meet with failure. Excavations at the site, roughly in an area between the respective mortuary temple of Ramses III and that of Amenhotep III were carried out under the direction of Egyptian archaeologist Zahi Hawass, and began in September 2020, beginning with what turned out to be the southern quarters of the city. The city's remains were stumbled upon when Hawass and his team were searching for the remains of the funerary temple of Tutankhamun. The find turned out to reveal what appears to be the greatest administrative and industrial centre of that period.

It forms part of Amenhotep's palace complex (Malkata, also known originally as "the Dazzling Aten") lying just north of the new area. The confirmation of the discovery was announced by Hawass on 8 April 2021. Egyptologist Betsy Bryan hailed it as the most important archaeological discovery in Egypt since the excavation of the tomb of Tutankhamun.

Structure
To date several distinct neighbourhoods, formed by zigzagging mudbrick walls, have been uncovered, including a bakery quarter, replete with items of everyday life and work related to the town's artistic and industrial life. Three distinct palaces have been identified.  , the northern quarters and the town's cemetery have been located, but are unexcavated.

Maps

See also
 Malkata, also known as The Dazzling Aten

Notes

Footnotes

Citations

Sources

2021 archaeological discoveries
Archaeological sites in Egypt
Atenism
Cities in ancient Egypt
Populated places established in the 4th millennium BC
Former populated places in Egypt
Theban Necropolis